Amica Chips–Tacconi Sport was an Italian professional cycling team that existed from 1996 to 2000.

In 2000, the team split, creating new team , and Amica Chips–Tacconi Sport.

Famous riders
 Claudio Chiappucci (1998–1999)
 Viacheslav Ekimov (1999)
 Evgeni Berzin (1999)
 Pietro Caucchioli (1999–2000)
 Ivan Basso (2000)

References

Defunct cycling teams based in Italy
Cycling teams based in Italy
Cycling teams established in 1996
Cycling teams disestablished in 2000